Never Say Die (literally: The Bashful Iron Fist) is a 2017 Chinese comedy film directed by Song Yang and Zhang Chiyu and starring Ai Lun, Ma Li, Shen Teng, Tian Yu and Xue Haowen. Adapted from the popular stage comedy of the same name, it was released in China on 30 September 2017.  According to The Hollywood Reporter, the film is the highest-grossing comedy film ever in a single (its home domestic) box office market.

Plot

A male boxer switches bodies by accident with a female journalist after the two are struck by lightning. Living out each other's lives in seemingly opposite roles, the two struggle to adjust, but eventually come to grips with each other, unearthing an even greater conspiracy within the boxing world.

Cast
Ai Lun
Ma Li
Shen Teng
Tian Yu
Xue Haowen
Yin Zheng

Box office

Awards and nominations

References

External links 

Chinese fantasy comedy films
2010s sports comedy films
Body swapping in films
Tianjin Maoyan Media films
Huaxia Film Distribution films
2010s fantasy comedy films
2017 comedy films